Hair of the dog is a colloquial English expression describing a cure or treatment for an alcohol-induced hangover. 

Hair of the dog may also refer to:
Hair of the Dog (film), a 1962 British comedy film
Hair of the Dog Brewing Company, a microbrewery located in Portland, Oregon
 Hair of the Dog, Episode 148 of the Mythbusters television series

Albums 
Hair of the Dog (album), a 1975 album by Nazareth
Hair of the Dog, a 1989 compilation album by Tankard

Songs 
"Hair of the Dog" (song), by Nazareth from the album of the same name
"Hair of the Dog", by Mud from the 1975 album Use Your Imagination
"Hair of the Dog", by Bauhaus from the 1981 album Mask
"Hair of the Dog", by the Ramones from the 1986 album Animal Boy
"Hair of the Dog", by The Poor from the 1994 album Who Cares
"Hair of the Dog", by Loverboy from the 1997 album Six
"Hair of the Dog", by Shooter Jennings from the 2006 album Electric Rodeo
"Hair of the Dog", by Senses Fail from the 2008 album Life Is Not a Waiting Room